Gingee N. Ramachandran (born 3 June 1944) is an Indian politician. He was elected to the Lok Sabha, lower house of the Parliament of India  as member of the Marumalarchi Dravida Munnetra Kazhagam.He was the Union Minister of State, Textiles and Finance & Company Affairs in Vajpayee Ministry.He joined the AIADMK in the presence of Jayalalitha in 2014.

References

External links
 Official biographical sketch in Parliament of India website

1944 births
Living people
Indian Tamil people
Lok Sabha members from Tamil Nadu
India MPs 1998–1999
India MPs 1999–2004
India MPs 2004–2009
Union Ministers from Tamil Nadu
Dravida Munnetra Kazhagam politicians
People from Viluppuram district
People from Tiruvannamalai district